Xyrospondylus is an extinct genus of non-mammalian synapsids belonging to the Edaphosauridae. The type species, X. ecordi, was named in 1982; it was originally named as a species of Edaphosaurus in 1957.

It lived during the Pennsylvanian (Missourian) in Kansas and possibly also Colorado and the holotype is known from a single cervical vertebra found in the Stanton Formation. A second specimen, consisting of a fragmentary pelvis, is also known. A third specimen, known from Colorado, is known, but it probably does not pertain to Xyrospondylus.

See also 
 List of pelycosaurs
 List of therapsids

References 

Edaphosaurids
Prehistoric synapsid genera
Carboniferous synapsids of North America
Paleontology in Kansas
Fossil taxa described in 1982
Taxa named by Robert R. Reisz